Sotieḷḷo is one of 24 parishes (administrative divisions) in Ḷḷena, a municipality within the province and autonomous community of Asturias, in coastal northern Spain.  

Towns 
 Alceo
 San Bras 
 Sotieḷḷo

References

External links

 Asturian society of economic and industrial studies, English language version of "Sociedad Asturiana de Estudios Económicos e Industriales" (SADEI)

Parishes in Lena